Scaphella gaudiati is a species of sea snail, a marine gastropod mollusk in the family Volutidae, the volutes.

Description

Distribution

References

 Bail, P.; Shelton, D.N. (2001). Scaphella (Scaphella) gaudiati n.sp. (Gastropoda: Volutidae: Scaphellinae) a new volute from the Caribbean Sea. Novapex (Jodoigne) 2(4): 137-140 

Volutidae
Gastropods described in 1999